The Tercio of Idiaquez was a Spanish native tercio, a group of armed infantry,  who fought in the Battle of Nördlingen, in the Thirty Years' War.

References

Thirty Years' War